Grand Prairie may refer to:

Grand Prairie (Georgia), a swamp in Georgia
Grand Prairie, Texas, a city
Grande Prairie, a city in Alberta, Canada

See also
Grand Prairie Township (disambiguation)